Amedeo Baldizzone (2 May 1960 – 13 December 2020) was an Italian footballer and manager.

Club career

A defender, Baldizzone first played for Atalanta in 1979 against Inter. He made two appearances in Serie A before being loaned to Forlì for a season. In 1981 he signed for Cagliari. Baldizzone suffered a knee injury against Como and underwent three operations but had to retire due to the injury.

Managerial career

Baldizzone managed Zingonia where he won the Terza Categoria and repeated the feat with Orio. He then managed the youth at Casazza before moving to the AlbinoLeffe Esordienti B team and retired in 2009.

Personal life

Baldizzone was married and had three children. In 2009 he emigrated to Spain where he owned a pizzeria restaurant.

Honours

Manager

Zingonia

Terza Categoria: 1994–95

Orio

Terza Categoria: 1996–97

References

External links
 

1960 births
2020 deaths
Footballers from Genoa
Italian footballers
Association football defenders
Italian football managers
Atalanta B.C. players
Como 1907 players
Forlì F.C. players
Cagliari Calcio players
Piacenza Calcio 1919 players